"Saxofuckingfon" is a song by the Swedish duo Samir & Viktor. The song was released in Sweden as a digital download on 5 June 2015. The song peaked at number two on the Swedish Singles Chart.

Track listing

Charts

Weekly charts

Year-end charts

Certifications

Release history

References

2015 songs
2015 singles
Swedish pop songs
Warner Music Group singles
Samir & Viktor songs
Swedish-language songs
Songs written by Anton Hård af Segerstad